The King of Kings Tournament 1999 was a series of three separate mixed martial arts events held by the Fighting Network Rings (RINGS). The tournament took place in both Tokyo and Osaka between October 28, 1999 and February 26, 2000. The tournament was the first of two King of Kings tournaments. The tournament matched up 32 of the best fighters from nine different countries.

Rules
The tournament had two qualifying events: King of Kings 1999 Block A and King of Kings 1999 Block B. The fighters who advance from the qualifying events would compete 
in the King of Kings 1999 Final. The fights would consist of two five-minute rounds and, as in all RINGS bouts, no striking was allowed to the head of a grounded opponent.

King of Kings 1999 Block A
The first event of the tournament took place on October 28, 1999 at the Yoyogi National Stadium in Tokyo, Japan.

Results

King of Kings 1999 Block B
The second event of the tournament took place on December 22, 1999 at the Osaka Prefectural Gymnasium in Osaka, Japan.

Results

King of Kings 1999 Final
The third and final event of the tournament took place on February 26, 2000 at the Nippon Budokan in Tokyo, Japan.

Results

Tournament Bracket

See also 
 Fighting Network Rings
 List of Fighting Network Rings events
 1999 in Fighting Network Rings
 2000 in Fighting Network Rings

References

Fighting Network Rings events
1999 in mixed martial arts
2000 in mixed martial arts
Mixed martial arts in Japan
Sports competitions in Osaka
Sports competitions in Tokyo